The Inauguration of Carlos P. Garcia as the eighth president of the Philippines took place on December 30, 1957, at the Independence Grandstand in Manila. The inauguration marked the commencement of the second term (and only full four-year term) of Carlos P. Garcia as president and the only four-year term of Diosdado Macapagal as Vice President. The oath of office was administered by Chief Justice of the Supreme Court of the Philippines Ricardo Paras.

Context
The inauguration formally ended the Presidential transition of Carlos P. Garcia that began when Garcia won the 1957 Philippine presidential election. Garcia took his first oath of office at the Malacañan Palace following the tragic death of President Ramon Magsaysay in a plane crash. His succession to the presidency is to finish the unexpired term of Magsaysay.

1957 in the Philippines
Presidency of Carlos P. Garcia
Garcia, Carlos